Seymour-Conway is the surname of:
Alice Seymour-Conway, Viscountess Beauchamp (1749–1772)
Francis Seymour-Conway (disambiguation), multiple people
Lord George Seymour-Conway (1763–1848), British politician
Henry Seymour Conway (1721–1795), British general and statesman, son of Francis Seymour-Conway, 1st Baron Conway
Henry Seymour-Conway, later Lord Henry Seymour (politician) (1746–1830)
Hugh Seymour-Conway, later Lord Hugh Seymour (1759–1801)
Isabella Seymour-Conway (disambiguation), multiple people
Maria Seymour-Conway, Marchioness of Hertford (1771–1856)
Popham Seymour-Conway (1675–1699), Anglo-Irish landowner and Member of Parliament
Richard Seymour-Conway, 4th Marquess of Hertford (1800–1870)
Robert Seymour-Conway, later Lord Robert Seymour (1748–1831)

See also
Seymour (surname)
Conway (surname)

Compound surnames
English-language surnames
Surnames of English origin